Franz Keller may refer to:

 Franz Keller (psychologist) (1913–1991), Swiss psychologist, Christian pacifist and left-wing news editor
 Franz Keller (skier) (born 1945), West German Nordic combined skier and Olympic gold medallist